Kalev Eduard Vann (4 December 1956 – 13 December 2011) was an Australian rules footballer, who played for the Fitzroy Football Club in the Victorian Football League (VFL). He wore number 13 in his year at Fitzroy, and played two games. He did not score in either of those games, despite being a forward. He suffered a knee injury in 1980, but was back in full form in 1981. He had 3 children, one named Jaiden, then Kiel and his daughter Kendra. He died of cancer in 2011, aged 55.

References

External links

Fitzroy Football Club players
1956 births
2011 deaths
Preston Football Club (VFA) players
Epping Football Club players
Deaths from cancer in Victoria (Australia)
Australian rules footballers from Melbourne
South Morang Football Club players
People from Carlton, Victoria